The poverty gap index is a measure of the intensity of poverty. It is defined as the average poverty gap in the population as a proportion of the poverty line.

The poverty gap index is an improvement over the poverty measure head count ratio which simply counts all the people below a poverty line, in a given population, and considers them equally poor. Poverty gap index estimates the depth of poverty by considering how far, on the average, the poor are from that poverty line.

Definition
The poverty gap index sometimes referred to as poverty gap ratio or pg index is defined as average of the ratio of the poverty gap to the poverty line. It is expressed as a percentage of the poverty line for a country or region.

Significance
The most common method measuring and reporting poverty is the head count ratio, given as the percentage of population that is below the poverty line. For example, The New York Times in July 2012 reported the poverty head count ratio as 11.1% of American population in 1973, 15.2% in 1983 and 11.3% in 2000. One of the undesirable features of the head count ratio is that it ignores the depth of poverty; if the poor become poorer, the head count index does not change.

Poverty gap index provides a clearer perspective on the depth of poverty. It enables poverty comparisons. It also helps provide an overall assessment of a region's progress in poverty reduction and the evaluation of specific public policies or private initiatives.

Calculation
The poverty gap index (PGI) is calculated as,

or

In this calculation, individuals whose income is above the poverty line have a gap of zero.

By definition, the poverty gap index is a percentage between 0 and 100%. Sometimes it is reported as a fraction, between 0 and 1. A theoretical value of zero implies that no one in the population is below the poverty line. A theoretical value of 100% implies that everyone in the population has zero income.

Features
The poverty gap index can be interpreted as the average percentage shortfall in income for the population, from the poverty line.

If you multiply a country's poverty gap index by both the poverty line and the total number of individuals in the country you get the total amount of money needed to bring the poor in the population out of extreme poverty and up to the poverty line, assuming perfect targeting of transfers. For example, suppose a country has 10 million individuals, a poverty line of $500 per year and a poverty gap index of 5%. Then an average increase of $25 per individual per year would eliminate extreme poverty. Note that $25 is 5% of the poverty line. The total increase needed to eliminate poverty is US$250 million—$25 multiplied by 10 million individuals.

The poverty gap index is an important measure beyond the commonly used head count ratio. Two regions may have the similar head count ratio, but distinctly different poverty gap indices. A higher poverty gap index means that poverty is more severe.

The poverty gap index is additive. In other words, the index can be used as an aggregate poverty measure, as well as decomposed for various sub-groups of the population, such as by region, employment sector, education level, gender, age or ethnic group.

Limitations
Poverty gap index ignores the effect of inequality between the poor. It does not capture differences in the severity of poverty amongst the poor. As a theoretical example, consider two small neighborhoods where just two households each are below the official poverty line of US$500 income per year. In one case, household 1 has an income of US$100 per year and household 2 has an income of US$300 per year. In second case, the two households both have annual income of US$200 per year. The poverty gap index for both cases is same (60%), even though the first case has one household, with US$100 per year income, experiencing a more severe state of poverty. Scholars, therefore, consider poverty gap index as a moderate but incomplete improvement over poverty head count ratio.

Scholars such as Amartya Sen suggest poverty gap index offers quantitative improvement over simply counting the poor below the poverty line, but remains limited at the qualitative level. Focusing on precisely measuring income gap diverts the attention from qualitative aspects such as capabilities, skills and personal resources that may sustainably eradicate poverty. A better measure would focus on capabilities and consequent consumption side of impoverished households. These suggestions were initially controversial, and have over time inspired scholars to propose numerous refinements.

Related measures
The Foster–Greer–Thorbecke metric is the general form of the PGI. The  formula raises the summands to the power alpha, so that FGT0 is the head count index, FGT1 the PGI and FGT2 the squared PGI.

It is calculated by averaging the square of the poverty gap ratio. By squaring each poverty gap data, the measure puts more weight the further a poor person's observed income falls below the poverty line. The squared poverty gap index is one form of a weighted sum of poverty gaps, with the weight proportionate to the poverty gap.

It is calculated as follows:

It is calculated as follows:

The terms used to calculate  are same as in poverty gap index (see the calculation section in this article).

Poverty gap index by country

The following table summarizes the poverty gap index for developed and developing countries across the world.

See also
Foster–Greer–Thorbecke indices
Gini coefficient
Multidimensional Poverty Index
Human Poverty Index
Human Development Index
Gender Development Index
Gender Empowerment Measure
Education Index

Notes

References

External links
 Basics of Poverty Reduction & Inequality Analysis: A World Bank resource on latest data and reports on poverty measurement
 Handbook on Poverty and Inequality: A handbook with examples, features and limitations of poverty measures
 Povcalnet: A continuously updated database with poverty gap index and other poverty analysis tools

Measurements and definitions of poverty